Juan Ardila is an American politician who is a member of the New York State Assembly for the 37th district. Elected in November 2022, he assumed office on January 1, 2023.

Early life and education 
Born in Elmhurst, Ardila was raised in Maspeth, Queens. After graduating from Archbishop Molloy High School, he earned a Bachelor of Arts degree in political science from Fordham University and a Master of Public Administration from the Robert F. Wagner Graduate School of Public Service at New York University.

Career 
From 2015 to 2017, Ardila served as the office manager and scheduler for City Councilman Brad Lander. He was also a youth tutor for the International Rescue Committee. From 2017 to 2019, he served as an expansion consultant for the New York City Department of Education. In 2019, he joined the Legal Aid Society as a program coordinator. Ardila was elected to the New York State Assembly in November 2022.

Controversies 

In 2021 while running for a City Council seat in Queens, Ardila faced scrutiny over racist and homophobic remarks made on social media. He placed second in the Democratic primary to incumbent Robert Holden.

In March 2023, Ardila was accused of sexual assault by two women and there were calls for Ardila to resign, including Governor Kathy Hochul.

References 

Living people
People from Maspeth, Queens
Hispanic and Latino American state legislators in New York (state)
Archbishop Molloy High School alumni
Fordham University alumni
Robert F. Wagner Graduate School of Public Service alumni
New York University alumni
American politicians of Colombian descent
American politicians of Cuban descent
Year of birth missing (living people)